Mian Rah (also Romanized as Mīān Rāh; also known as Mīān Rāh-e Vīzhehnān and Mīān Rāh-e Vīzhnān) is a village in Vizhenan Rural District, in the Central District of Gilan-e Gharb County, Kermanshah Province, Iran. At the 2006 census, its population was 60, in 11 families.

References 

Populated places in Gilan-e Gharb County